Tompkins Square Records is an independent record label producing archival releases of gospel, blues, jazz, and country music.

History
In 2005, Josh Rosenthal launched Tompkins Square Records in New York City after working 15 years in a variety of positions at Sony Music. Tompkins Square moved to San Francisco in 2011. Rosenthal runs the label on his own with help from an art director and publishing company.

Albums
Tompkins Square's first album was Imaginational Anthem, an anthology of music by fingerstyle guitarists including Jack Rose, Sandy Bull, John Fahey, Max Ochs, and Kaki King The series has grown to seven volumes.

Tompkins Square issued a previously-unreleased concert recording by Tim Buckley, Live at the Folklore Center, NYC — March 6, 1967.

Tompkins Square has released several comprehensive gospel music compilations, including 2009's Fire In My Bones: Raw & Rare & Other-Worldly African American Gospel (1944–2007) and This May Be My Last Time Singing: Raw African-American Gospel On 45RPM (1957–1982).

Rosenthal brought Charlie Louvin in to record a series of albums, introducing Louvin to a new generation of listeners.

Tompkins Square released Remembering Mountains: Unheard Songs of Karen Dalton, an album of songs written by Dalton and performed by artists such as Lucinda Williams, Sharon Van Etten, Tara Jane O'Neil, and Diane Cluck.

Tompkins Square released several 78 rpm Discs for Record Store Day. Artists involved included Luther Dickinson, Tyler Ramsey, and Ralph Stanley.

In 2015, Rosenthal wrote and published the book The Record Store of the Mind, a memoir about being a record collector and owning a record company.

Roster

 A Broken Consort
 Aberdeen City
 Amédé Ardoin
 Tom Armstrong
 Daniel Bachman
 Brad Barr
 Robbie Basho
 William C. Beeley
 Don Bikoff
 James Blackshaw
 Ran Blake
 Bob Brown
 Tim Buckley
 Joe Bussard
 Michael Chapman
 Richard Crandell
 Nick Jonah Davis
 Smoke Dawson
 Luther Dickinson
 Rick Deitrick
 James Elkington / Nathan Salsburg
 Frank Fairfield
 Mark Fosson 
 Charles Gayle
 Alice Gerrard
 Ben Hall
 Roscoe Holcomb
 Lena Hughes
 John Hulburt
 Bessie Jones with the Georgia Sea Island Singers
 Calvin Keys
 Kid Millions
 Philip Lewin
Mason Lindahl
 Giuseppi Logan
 Charlie Louvin
 Bill Mackay
 Harvey Mandel
 Suni Mcgrath
 Shawn David Mcmillen
 Polk Miller
 Spencer Moore
 Bern Nix
 Richard Osborn
 Charlie Poole and the Highlanders
 Brigid Mae Power
 Prefab Sprout
 Tyler Ramsey
 Red Fox Chasers
 Ben Reynolds
 Sean Smith
 Powell St. John
 Ralph Stanley
 Harry Taussig
 Michael Taylor / Hiss Golden Messenger
 William Tyler
 Dino Valente
 Terry Waldo
 Peter Walker
 Ryley Walker
 Roland White
 Bill Wilson

See also 
 List of record labels

References

External links
 

American record labels
American independent record labels